Freezing is the process in which a liquid turns into a solid when cold enough.

Freezing may also refer to:

Arts, entertainment, and media
 Freezing (film), a 2007 comedy film
 Freezing (manga), a manga and anime series written by Dall-Young Lim and illustrated by Kwang-Hyun Kim
 Freezing (TV series), a BBC comedy series

Healthcare
 Freezing, using local anesthetics in dentistry
 Frostbite, freezing of tissues
 Gait freezing, a common motor symptom of Parkinson's disease
 Hypothermia, a biological condition in response to colder temperatures

Other uses
 Directional freezing
 Freezing, the melting point of water,  
 Freezing air temperature
 Freezing of assets
 Freezing behavior

See also
 Freeze (disambiguation)
 Frozen (disambiguation)
 Hang (computing)